IMes is an abbreviation for an organic compound that is a common ligand in organometallic chemistry.  It is an N-heterocyclic carbene (NHC).  The compound, a white solid, is often not isolated but instead is generated upon attachment to the metal centre.

First prepared by Arduengo, the heterocycle is synthesized by condensation of 2,4,6-trimethylaniline and glyoxal to give the diimine.  In the presence of acid, the resulting glyoxal-bis(mesitylimine) condenses with formaldehyde to give the dimesitylimidazolium cation.  This cation is the conjugate acid of the NHC.

Related compounds
Bulkier than IMes is the NHC ligand IPr (CAS 244187-81-3).  IPr features diisopropylphenyl in place of the mesityl substituents.  

Some variants of IMes and IPr have saturated backbones, two such ligands are SIMes and SIPr.  They are prepared by alkylation of substituted anilines with dibromoethane followed by ring closure and dehydrohalogenation of the dihydroimidazolium salt.

References

Further reading
 

Organometallic chemistry
Carbenes
Ligands